Ring of Hands is a 1971 album and the second released by British rock band Argent. It was originally released on Epic Records, E 30128.

The song "Chained" was re-recorded by Three Dog Night on their 1972 release Seven Separate Fools. This was the second Argent song covered by them.

Track listing
Songs written by Rod Argent and Chris White except as noted.

Personnel
Argent
 Rod Argent – organ, electric piano, lead (1, 2, 6, 7) and backing vocals
 Russ Ballard – guitar, lead (1-5, 8, 9) and backing vocals, piano (3)
 Jim Rodford – bass guitar, backing vocals, guitar
 Robert Henrit – drums, percussion
Technical
 Jerry Boys – engineer
A two-disc CD re-issue of this album plus Argent (1970) was released by BGO Records in 2000.

References

Argent (band) albums
1971 albums
Albums produced by Rod Argent
Albums produced by Chris White (musician)
Albums with cover art by Hipgnosis
Epic Records albums